The Poker Flat Research Range (PFRR) is a launch facility and rocket range for sounding rockets in the U.S. state of Alaska, located on a  site at Chatanika, about 30 miles (50 km) northeast of Fairbanks and 1.5 degrees south of the Arctic Circle. More than 1,700 launches have been conducted at the range to study the Earth's atmosphere and the interaction between the atmosphere and the space environment. Areas studied at PFRR include the aurora, plasma physics, the ozone layer, solar proton events, Earth's magnetic field, and ultraviolet radiation.

PFRR is owned by the University of Alaska Fairbanks (UAF) Geophysical Institute, the only such owned by a university in the world, and is operated under contract to the NASA Wallops Flight Facility. Other users include the United States Naval Research Laboratory (NRL), the Air Force Geophysics Lab (AFGL), and various universities and research laboratories. Since its founding in 1948, PFRR has been closely aligned with and funded by the Defense Threat Reduction Agency and its predecessor, the Defense Nuclear Agency (DNA).

History
The University of Alaska had performed auroral research since the 1920s, and when sounding rockets were developed for this purpose, the university decided to build a range for them. The UAF Geophysical Institute leased the land that became the PFRR from the state of Alaska, and the range's facilities were initially completed in 1948 with leadership and vision from T. Neil Davis.  PFRR's first supervisor, Neal Brown, directed the facility for 18 years, from 1971 to 1989. In the 1990s, new facilities were built with a $30 million grant provided by Congress.  Refurbishment of older facilities is an ongoing project.

Facilities
Range facilities include an administrative facility, a concrete blockhouse used as a mission control center, several rocket assembly buildings, a 2-story science observatory, and a payload assembly building. Three S-band antennas are used to collect telemetry, and a C-band radar is used for tracking rocket payloads in flight.

Poker Flat's activities are changing with the recent addition of SRI's PFISR (Poker Flat Incoherent Scatter Radar) phased-array antenna and the recent purchase of several Insitu drones.

The Alaska Ground Station (AGS) supports PFRR operations of many NASA and other nation's spacecraft including Aqua, Aura, Terra, and Landsat 7 with S band and X band services. The Honeywell Datalynx PF1 & PF2 antennas were hosted at the range, as part of the Earth Observing System Polar Ground Network (EPGN), along with the Alaska Ground Station (AGS). However, PF1 & PF2 were purchased by Universal Space Networks, now part of Swedish Space Corp SSC and later moved to SSC's North Pole facility and renamed USAK04 and USAK05. Other ground stations in the EPGN include the Svalbard Satellite Station (SGS), the Kongsberg–Lockheed Martin ground station (SKS), and the SvalSat ground station (SG3) in Norway, as well as the SSC North Pole facility.

Sounding rockets

 Arcas
 Astrobee
 Black Brant
 MIM-23 Hawk
 MGR-1 Honest John
 Javelin
 Loki
 Nike
 Rocketsonde
 Sandhawk
 MGM-29 Sergeant
 Strypi
 RIM-2 Terrier
 TE-416 Tomahawk

See also
 High Power Auroral Stimulation
 High-frequency Active Auroral Research Program (HAARP)

References

Further reading
 
 Merritt Helfferich, Neal Boyd Brown, and Peggy Dace. 1980. Poker Flat Research Range: Range Users' Handbook. Geophysical Institute: University of Alaska Fairbanks.

External links

 
 Poker Flat at Encyclopedia Astronautica.
 Aurora rocket article from USA Today.
 Svabard Satellite Station (SvalSat)
 Kongsberg Satellite Services AS official website
 Swedish Space Corporation

Buildings and structures in Fairbanks North Star Borough, Alaska
Rocket launch sites in the United States
Science and technology in Alaska
University of Alaska Fairbanks
1968 establishments in Alaska